Tomás Vélez Cachupín was a colonial judge, and the Spanish colonial governor of Santa Fe de Nuevo México province (present day New Mexico), located in the northern Viceroyalty of New Spain (colonial México), from 1749 to 1754 and 1762 to 1767. During his rule, Cachupín achieved the peace between Spaniards and the Amerindian peoples of New Mexico, especially the Comanches. He also protected the right to the possession of lands by the people of New Mexico, including the Amerindians, fining and imprisoning those who occupied the lands of others under the idea that these lands were property of their inhabitants.

Governor

First term
Vélez Cachupín was appointed governor of New Mexico in early 1749 and assumed the office in May of that year. After settling in New Mexico as governor, he noticed the frequent attacks the Comanches were directing against the places where the Spanish and Mestizos lived. These attacks were not only dangerous because they resulted in kidnappings and the killing of settlers and their descendants in the province, they also impeded economic growth. To remedy this situation, Vélez Cachupin decided to improve the quality of life of the indigenous people, hoping that they would respect him. In addition, he hoped that trade with the Native American tribes would help the economy of New Mexico.

As a result, in July 1750, a group of about 130 Comanches moved to Taos to live there temporarily. They were distributed in forty tents and established commercial relations with the residents of the region, with who they exchanged hides and slaves. Although the governor agreed to the trade, he warned them to send a troop against them if, after trading with Taos, the Comanches raided Pecos and Galisteo. This mistrust was normal because the Spanish of the province considered the Comanches to be their main enemy. The Comanche chiefs promised not to assault those regions again, but not all Comanches cared about the threat. A group of them raided Pecos in November of that year.

After hearing this news, Vélez Cachupin led an army against the Comanches and started looking for them, which lasted six days. He found to 145 of the Comanche attackers, which provoked the Battle of San Diego Pond, which pitted Spaniards against Comanches. The governor ordered his army to murder any Comanche they saw. After the battle began, only the cries of women and children persuaded him to give the Comanches a chance to surrender, promising them that he would not kill them if they abandoned the battle. At first, the Comanches were determined to fight. The war only lasted until midnight when an adolescent, who was already wounded, surrendered with a reed cross in his hands. Vélez accepted his surrender and respect him, so the rest of the tribe came to trust the governor and abandoned the battle themselves. After this incident, only the chief and seven other men wanted to keep fighting. The new battle started at three o'clock, but the Comanches were quickly defeated. However, throughout the night the Velez Cachupin army captured 49 Comanches, while the number of horses and mules they captured was over 150. The rest of the Comanches were killed. At dawn, Cachupín released almost all the prisoners, although he kept four. Vélez Cachupin forced them to refrain from attacking Spanish settlements, warning them that if they did, he would ban their trade with Taos and he would murder all of them. The courage he showed when he fought with the Comanches and the respect and compassion he directed towards them allowed him to obtain the nickname "the captain who amazes" by the Comanches, who began to respect him. This also boosted the peace of the Spanish and Criollos with the Utes and Apaches (who became its principal allies).

In 1754, Cachupín promulgated a list of products traded by the Amerindians of the Plains. This list included the prices of the products those peoples traded together with the equivalent prices in Spanish currency, in order to regulate buying and selling at the fairs. The list was intended to prevent that misunderstandings may arise between the Comanches and Spaniards. On the other hand, Cachupín learned to relate with the Comanches, Utes and Apaches through the study of these people. In fact, Vélez wrote to his successor about the behavior and the actions he should take when he contacted with Comanches, in order to no misunderstandings and maintain peace in New Mexico.

Also in 1754, Cachupín favored the migration to both the places that had already been abandoned and new places. These last ones were founded in strategic places, creating: Abiquiu, Las Trampas, Ojo Caliente and Truchas among others. Following the indications of Cachupín, a square with defensive functions would be established in these places. Few settlers, however, accepted the type of settlement Cachupín proposed.

Confrontation with the friars 

Although Vélez Cachupín achieved peace with the Comanches, he got the enemy of the franciscans, especially Andres Varo. Cachupín and Varo sent a large number of letters to the viceroy criticizing each other. Although Vélez Cachupín defended the Christianization of the indigenous, which was carried out by the Franciscans, he rejected "to certain practices and specific priests". The Franciscans tried to expel Cachupin from his position as governor, but were unable to do so, probably due of the familiarity and friendship that had between Cachupín and Viceroy Revilla Gigedo. Indeed, Cachupín was reappointed, despite the refusal of the Franciscans to make such an appointment.

Second term
After completing his first term in 1754, Vélez Cachupin returned to Spain. He requested to King of Spain for a new term as governor of New Mexico. So, Cachupín was reappointed as governor of the province on 14 March 1761. However, when he returned to New Mexico, he again had to solve many of the problems he had already solved during his previous term, as his successor had not followed his advice on to how to interact peacefully with the native peoples.

When he began his second term as governor, Vélez Cachupín found many Comanches prisoners present, so he decided to release six women of this people to establish a new beginning of peace with the Comanches. Because of this, a group of fifteen Comanches (nine warriors and six woman) went to Taos both to check that Cachupin was back in the province and to "negotiate" with him. Cachupín banned trade in Comanche slaves by the Spanish, in order to maintain peace with this people. However, Cachupín ordered the Spaniards and Creoles who resided near the provincial capital, Santa Fe, and had Comanche slaves to keep them, as the governor might have problems with the Comanches in the future and might need to exchange prisoners with this people.

Cachupín not only had political functions, but also judicial and economic functions. In fact, he was New Mexico's chief judge (for both civil and criminal cases).

In November 1750, French traders Paul and Pierre Mallet visited New Mexico from New France. This was the second visit of them to New Mexico (the first was in 1739), but Cachupín took his goods and sold them at auction, which allowed him to pay four guards to take them to Mexico City. This was because the French had started a trade war with New Mexico and were trying to occupy most of northern Spanish Texas, making France one of its main rivals.

In 1762, after learning that an Ute had been found in possession of a silver ingot, Vélez Cachupín ordered Spanish explorers Juan Maria Antonio de Rivera, Joaquín Laín, Gregorio Sandoval and Pedro Mora, to Colorado to locate where the ingot had come from. Locating gold and silver was a priority in order to replenish the royal coffers. The expedition traveled through southwestern Colorado and southeastern Utah (which belonged to Spain at this time), establishing sections of future Old Spanish Trail.

Vélez also enacted a series of laws to protect Amerindian lands: In 1764, Vélez Cachupín gave land to the Amerindians and later convinced the Suma Amerindians to reside in San Lorenzo, on land near to that he had given the another Amerindians in 1764, promising to protect them. He also banned inhabitants from El Paso–Juárez (which at that time was a unique city) from entering Amerindian lands for any reason including grazing sheep, or gathering firewood. In addition, any person who cut trees on Amerindian lands would be punished with a fine of 40 pesos or imprisonment for two years. Additionally, he would confiscated their carts and oxen. The money obtained from the fines was used to buy agricultural tools for the Sumas. In 1766, he banned the inhabitants of Atrisco from occupying land in San Fernando, because these lands were to be used only by their inhabitants. Whoever broke the ban would have to pay a fine of 30 pesos for each infraction. He also protected the lands of the Genizaros of Belen and of Santa Clara, and San Ildefonso Pueblo.

In November 1765, Cachupín was forced to ban tobacco growing in New Mexico, following a law issued by the Viceroy, who had established a monopoly on the plant. However, the governor had tried unsuccessfully to prevent enforcement of the law, because it could harm the economy of the province and the relations between the Native Americans and the Spaniards, since they bought the tobacco from the farmers of New Mexico. Indeed, in January 1766,Capuchin reported to the viceroy through a letter the reasons why the law banning tobacco cultivation in New Mexico was harmful to the province, but the viceroy ignored it. When the law was established in the province, Cachupín's alleged consequences became real.

He was replaced by Francisco Antonio Marín del Valle as governor of Santa Fe de Nuevo México province in 1767.

See also

List of Spanish governors of New Mexico

References

Citations

Sources 
 New Mexico Office of the State Historian: Cachupín, Tomás Vélez. Published by Suzanne Stamatov between 2004 and 2010. New Mexico State Record Center and Archives.  Consulted 4 April 2011, to 23: 36 pm.
 Ebright, Malcolm (2014). Advocates for the Oppressed: Hispanos, Indians, Genízaros, and Their Land in New Mexico. Pages 196 and 219 - 230.
 Aton, James M.; McPherson, Robert S. (2000). River Flowing from the Sunrise: An Environmental History of the Lower San Juan. Utah State University Press.
 Buckley, Jay H.; Rensink, Brenden W. (2015). Historical Dictionary of the American Frontier. Page 175.
SFGateThe Hispanic Role in America: A chronology. Compiled by Dr. Juan Manuel Pérez.  Hispanic Division. Library of Congress. Retrieved in Juny 15, 2014, ar 18:25.

External links
  New Mexico Office of the State Historian: Governor Cachupin and the Pueblo Grant.
  Asociación de Amigos del Patrimonio de Laredo— (Heritage Association of Friends of Laredo).

Colonial governors of Santa Fe de Nuevo México
1740s in New Mexico
1750s in New Mexico
1760s in New Mexico
18th-century Spanish people